Mountain Home is an unincorporated community in Clay County, West Virginia, United States.

References 

Unincorporated communities in West Virginia
Unincorporated communities in Clay County, West Virginia
Charleston, West Virginia metropolitan area